Metro City Bank is a Korean-American bank based in Doraville, Georgia and offers personal and commercial banking services. It is the largest Korean-American bank to not be based out of Los Angeles, California. It currently operates a total of 19 branches in Texas, New York, New Jersey, Virginia, Georgia, Alabama, and Florida.

Overview
Although being relatively young, Metro City Bank has grown to be one of the biggest Korean-American banks in the country since its beginnings in 2014. The bank is state chartered and FDIC insured. It offers a financial products and services specifically for customers, which include small business owners, professionals, consumers and real estate developers. It offers personal and business banking, commercial real estate loans, commercial loans, automobile loans, personal loans, personal lines of credit, residential mortgages, Small Business Administration loans, and USDA B&I loans.

References

Companies listed on the Nasdaq
Banks established in 2014
Banks based in Georgia (U.S. state)
Companies based in Doraville, Georgia
Korean American banks